Harry Cunningham (born 6 December 1993) is a professional Australian rules footballer who plays for the Sydney Swans in the Australian Football League (AFL).

He was recruited by the club with pick 93 overall in the 2012 Rookie draft, before being promoted to the senior list in 2012. Elevated from the rookie list prior to the 2012 season, Cunningham made his debut in the inaugural Sydney Derby, Round 1, against . In Round 15, 2014 Cunningham was awarded a nomination for the 2014 AFL Rising Star for his efforts against the GWS Giants.

Statistics
Updated to the end of the 2022 season.

|-
| 2012 ||  || 44
| 1 || 0 || 0 || 4 || 0 || 4 || 2 || 1 || 0.0 || 0.0 || 4.0 || 0.0 || 4.0 || 2.0 || 1.0
|-
| 2013 ||  || 7
| 5 || 4 || 1 || 20 || 21 || 41 || 11 || 7 || 0.8 || 0.2 || 4.0 || 4.2 || 8.2 || 2.2 || 1.4
|-
| 2014 ||  || 7
| 25 || 15 || 5 || 159 || 162 || 321 || 103 || 74 || 0.6 || 0.2 || 6.4 || 6.5 || 12.8 || 4.1 || 3.0
|-
| 2015 ||  || 7
| 21 || 12 || 7 || 163 || 153 || 316 || 85 || 67 || 0.6 || 0.3 || 7.8 || 7.3 || 15.0 || 4.0 || 3.2
|-
| 2016 ||  || 7
| 18 || 5 || 2 || 131 || 118 || 249 || 55 || 69 || 0.3 || 0.1 || 7.3 || 6.6 || 13.8 || 3.1 || 3.8
|-
| 2017 ||  || 7
| 11 || 5 || 1 || 83 || 73 || 156 || 32 || 42 || 0.5 || 0.1 || 7.5 || 6.6 || 14.2 || 2.9 || 3.8
|-
| 2018 ||  || 7
| 23 || 7 || 5 || 251 || 171 || 422 || 106 || 78 || 0.3 || 0.2 || 10.9 || 7.4 || 18.3 || 4.6 || 3.4
|-
| 2019 ||  || 7
| 9 || 0 || 1 || 121 || 63 || 184 || 52 || 25 || 0.0 || 0.1 || 13.4 || 7.0 || 20.4 || 5.8 || 2.8
|-
| 2020 ||  || 7
| 17 || 0 || 1 || 157 || 96 || 253 || 59 || 38 || 0.0 || 0.1 || 9.2 || 5.6 || 14.9 || 3.5 || 2.2
|-
| 2021 ||  || 7
| 21 || 0 || 0 || 229 || 113 || 342 || 108 || 55 || 0.0 || 0.0 || 10.9 || 5.4 || 16.3 || 5.1 || 2.6
|-
| 2022 ||  || 7
| 10 || 0 || 0 || 58 || 53 || 111 || 33 || 24 || 0.0 || 0.0 || 5.8 || 5.3 || 11.1 || 3.3 || 2.4
|- class=sortbottom
! colspan=3 | Career
! 161 !! 48 !! 23 !! 1376 !! 1023 !! 2399 !! 646 !! 480 !! 0.3 !! 0.1 !! 8.5 !! 6.4 !! 14.9 !! 4.0 !! 3.0
|}

Honours and achievements
Team
 2× McClelland Trophy: 2014, 2016

Individual
 AFL Rising Star nominee: 2014 (round 15)

References

External links

1993 births
Living people
Sydney Swans players
Australian rules footballers from New South Wales